Municipal Corporations Act is the statutory Acts created for governing of Municipal Corporations across various Indian towns and cities.  Municipal Corporation mechanism in India was introduced during British Rule with formation of municipal corporation in Madras (Chennai) in 1688, later followed by municipal corporations in Bombay (Mumbai) and Calcutta (Kolkata) by 1762. The passing of Municipal Corporations Act by  State Governments is necessary for the creation of Municipal Corporations in any city of state.

History and Administration 

Municipal Corporations Act helps in laying strong guidelines for the functioning of municipal corporations which helps in city’s development.
In India the foundation for the democratic form of municipal governance had started 135 years back through Lord Ripon’s resolution of local self-government. Any Indian city with population of more than 10 lakhs or 1 million qualifies to become corporation. If the population of any are increases to more than 10000 than it will be declared as separate ward.

Municipal Acts in India are of below three types:

 General municipalities acts across states.

 Independent acts for setting up municipal corporations.

 Individual municipal corporations in specific cases.

Municipalities with Municipal Corporations Act 

In India there are many cities having Municipal Corporations which are governed by different municipal acts.

State-based Municipal Corporations Act list

In India different Municipal Corporations are governed by Acts applicable as below.

Andhra Pradesh

Assam

Bihar

Legal implications of Municipal Corporations Act  

1.For failure to adhering to Bangalore Municipal Corporation Act, 1949, High Court of Karnatka, in a Public Interest Litigation (PIL) petition, issued notices to the Karnatka State Government and Commissioners of 11 city corporations, in implementing uniform and effective guidelines in constituting ward committees and area sabhas across the State.

2. Mumbai Municipal Corporation Act, 1888, needs to be amended for revision in the number of wards in Mumbai and guidelines of Maharashtra Municipal Corporation Act, 1949 needs to be followed for revisions of ward numbers in other places of Maharashtra as the State Government plans to increase the number of seats in all municipal corporations. There are 27 municipal corporations in Maharashtra.

3. For failure to comply with Maharashtra Municipal Corporation Act 1949, and related Rules Pune activist serves legal notice to  Pune Municipal Corporation (PMC) administration.

4. Municipal Corporation Act 1995, Andhra Pradesh Municipalities Act 1965, Vishakapatnam Municipal Corporation Act, 1979, Vijayawada Municipal Act 1981, and Andhra Pradesh Municipal Corporation Act 1994 were amended by state of Andhra Pradesh for permission to mobile additional financial resources.

Related Links 

List of municipal corporations in India

References

External links 
 www.example.com

Law of India
Local government in India